Alex Suber (born December 1, 1986) is a gridiron football coach and former professional Canadian Football League player. He is currently the receivers coach for the Ottawa Redblacks of the Canadian Football League (CFL). He is a former defensive back who played for six seasons in the CFL with the Winnipeg Blue Bombers, Toronto Argonauts, and Saskatchewan Roughriders. He played college football for the Middle Tennessee Blue Raiders.

High School career
Suber was a four-year letter winner in football at Thomas Jefferson High School in Tampa, Florida. As a senior, Suber rushed for 1,592 yards and 16 touchdowns despite missing three games. In his final two games (semifinals and state championship), Suber rushed for a combined 446 yards and 5 touchdowns. 221 yards and 3 touchdowns vs Monsignor Pace, followed by 225 yards and 2 touchdowns against Jacksonville Bolles HS.
As a junior, Suber recorded more than 2,000 all-purpose yards and 19 touchdowns in earning a spot on the Class 3A all-state team. It was the second straight year he topped the 2,000-yard mark having done it as a sophomore as well. 
Rated a 2-star recruit by rivals.com and 3-star by 247sports.com, Suber had offers from Indiana, South Florida, San Diego State, Rutgers, and Ole Miss and signed with MTSU. Suber graduated Thomas Jefferson High School a member of the National Honor Society.

College career
In his first collegiate game at Middle Tennessee State University, Suber rushed for 22 yards on 7 carries and 18 yards receiving with 2 catches against Alabama University No. 2 defense in the country. Unfortunately, he suffered an ACL tear and received a medical redshirt only playing 3 games his freshman year. 
As a Sophomore, he was second on the team with a personal-best 59 tackles and 7.5 tackles for loss, an Interception, 5 pass breakups, 3 forced fumbles, and 2 fumble recoveries. Had 5 tackles to go along with a forced fumble and a fumble recovery against No. 2 Louisiana State University.
Junior year, Suber started in seven games. Ended the year with 26 tackles, a sack, 1.5 tackles for loss, 2 interceptions, 4 pass breakups, and a blocked kick. Had 3 tackles and an interception in the corner of the endzone with less than three minutes to play to seal the victory over University of Maryland while holding 1st Round NFL draft pick Darrius Heyward-Bey to only 3 receptions. Suber had a pass breakup and blocked his first career kick when he rejected a Kentucky field goal with 20 seconds to play while playing a team-high 102 snaps. Registered 5 tackles, a pass breakup, and an interception while covering 3rd Round draft pick T. Y. Hilton that he returned 60 yards against Florida International University while leading the team with 84 snaps. Suffered a broken jaw and was lost for the season.
As a senior, he had 57 tackles to go along with 4.5 sacks, 2 interceptions and 2 hurries. Also led the team with 12 pass breakups and tied for 28th nationally in passes defended. Collected 8 tackles, a sack, a pass breakup, and an interception returned 56 yards in road win over University of Louisiana Monroe. In the New Orleans Bowl win over University of Southern Mississippi, Suber recorded 5 tackles, including two for loss of yards, an interception, and a pass breakup.
In 2009, Suber was Named 1st team All-Sun Belt by the league's coaches and media. Named 1st team All-Sun Belt by rivals.com. Was named Sun Belt Conference Defensive Player of the Week on Nov. 30. In, 2008, he was named Sun Belt Conference Defensive Player of the Week for his play against the University of Maryland which included holding All-ACC receiver Darrius Heyward-Bey to just three catches. In 2007, Named honorable mention All-Sun Belt by the league's coaches and media.
Voted a permanent team captain by his MTSU teammates.

Professional career

Winnipeg Blue Bombers
On June 1, 2010, Suber signed with the Winnipeg Blue Bombers of the Canadian Football League as a free agent. He was a key player in the infamous 2011 Swaggerville defense that saw a post-season run to the 99th Grey Cup. In his first four seasons, all with the Blue Bombers, he had no fewer than 60 total tackles and also recorded six fumble recoveries.

Toronto Argonauts
Suber was traded to the Toronto Argonauts on September 2, 2014, where he registered an interception in just his second game with the team. He played in eight games for the Argonauts where he had 23 defensive tackles. He was released by the Argonauts during their 2015 training camp on June 13, 2015.

Saskatchewan Roughriders
On July 22, 2015, Suber signed with the Saskatchewan Roughriders where he played in three games to finish his career. Overall, he played in 76 career CFL regular season games and recorded 261 defensive tackles, 29 special teams tackles, 14 pass knockdowns, two interceptions, one sack, and one forced fumble. Suber signed a one-day contract with the Winnipeg Blue Bombers on January 15, 2016, in order to retire as a Blue Bomber.

Coaching career
In 2015, Suber started his coaching career at George S. Middleton High School in Tampa, Florida as the Defensive Backs coach during spring football in the off-season of his final year of playing in the Canadian Football League.

In 2016, he was a Special Teams Coordinator and Secondary coach at Westwood High School in Fort Pierce, Florida. 

From March to December 2017, Suber was a graduate assistant coach and football operations assistant for Bethune-Cookman University, working with the defensive backs and special teams.

In December 2017, Suber signed as the Defensive Coordinator and Secondary Coach at Lyon College.

In March 15, 2018, Suber joined the staff at Murray State University as the inside/outside receivers and tight ends coach.

On December 20, 2019, Suber was named receivers coach for the Ottawa Redblacks.

References

External links
Ottawa Redblacks bio

1986 births
Living people
Canadian football defensive backs
American football defensive backs
American players of Canadian football
Toronto Argonauts players
Winnipeg Blue Bombers players
Middle Tennessee Blue Raiders football players
Saskatchewan Roughriders players
Ottawa Redblacks coaches